James ("Jim") Robert Wallington (July 28, 1944 – April 20, 1988) was an American welterweight boxer from Philadelphia, Pennsylvania, who represented the United States at the 1968 Summer Olympics in Mexico City, Mexico.

Wallington won the bronze medal in the men's light welterweight division (– 63.5 kg) after a loss in the semifinals against eventual silver medalist Enrique Regueiferos from Cuba. He won the gold medal at the Pan American Games a year earlier. Wallington was also the US National Amateur Light Welterweight Champion in 1966 and 1967.

Wallington also served in the US Army.  He died aged 43.

1968 Olympic results
Below are the results of James Wallington, an American boxer who competed in the light welterweight classification at the 1968 Olympics in Mexico City:

 Round of 64: bye
 Round of 32: defeated Donato Cartagena (Dominican Republic) referee stopped contest
 Round of 16: defeated Alex Odhiambo (Uganda) by decision, 5-0
 Quarterfinal: defeated Kim Sa-yong (South Korea) by decision, 5-0
 Semifinal: lost to Enrique Regueiferos (Cuba) by decision, 1-4 (was awarded bronze medal)

References

1944 births
1988 deaths
Boxers from Philadelphia
Boxers at the 1968 Summer Olympics
Light-welterweight boxers
Place of birth missing
Winners of the United States Championship for amateur boxers
Olympic bronze medalists for the United States in boxing
Boxers at the 1967 Pan American Games
Pan American Games gold medalists for the United States
American male boxers
United States Army soldiers
Medalists at the 1968 Summer Olympics
Pan American Games medalists in boxing
Medalists at the 1967 Pan American Games